Made in Brazil (MIBR) is a professional esports organization with players competing in Counter-Strike: Global Offensive, Tom Clancy's Rainbow Six: Siege and VALORANT. It was a member of the G7 Teams. MIBR was founded on March 1, 2003, in the city of Rio de Janeiro, when the Brazilian businessman Paulo Velloso decided to invest in his son's dream. The organization was dissolved in 2012, but announced it was making a return in March 2016, returning to active play years later in June 2018.

History 
In January 2018, the MIBR brand was acquired by Immortals. In June of the same year, the roster of MIBR was reformed with the core members of the Luminosity Gaming/SK Gaming roster that won the MLG Columbus Major 2016 and ESL One Cologne 2016. On August 3, 2019, the Immortals Tom Clancy's Rainbow Six: Siege lineup was transferred to the MIBR name days before the Six Major Raleigh 2019.

In September 2020, CSGO coach Ricardo "dead" Sinigaglia was banned from nearly all notable tournaments (those organized by ESL, DreamHack, BLAST Premier, Eden Esports, and Beyond The Summit) following a ban by the Esports Integrity Commission (ESIC) for abusing a bug allowing him to get an advantage over a competing team as a coach. Later that month, dead, Fernando "fer" Alvarenga, and Epitácio "TACO" de Melo were removed by the organization following terrible results in the past eight months and especially in the past two months after traveling to Serbia from the United States for a bootcamp in Europe during the COVID-19 pandemic. The same day, Gabriel "FalleN" Toledo announced his self-benching from the active MIBR lineup after stating his dissatisfaction with the organization's decision to remove fer and TACO. Vito "kNgV-" Giuseppe also said he "did not agree with the [removal of fer and TACO]." This left only kNgV and trk remaining on the active lineup, the two newest members of the team.

Rosters

Counter Strike: Global Offensive division

Rainbow Six Siege division

VALORANT division

References

External links 
 

2003 establishments in Brazil
Esports teams based in Brazil
Immortals Gaming Club
Counter-Strike teams
Tom Clancy's Rainbow Six Siege teams
Valorant teams